Fie Woller (born 17 September 1992) is a Danish handball player for København Håndbold and the Danish national team.

References

Danish female handball players
1992 births
Living people
People from Herning Municipality
Expatriate handball players
Danish expatriate sportspeople in Germany
Sportspeople from the Central Denmark Region